Konrad Gałka (born February 3, 1974 in Kraków) is a former butterfly swimmer from Poland, who competed in two consecutive Summer Olympics for his native country, starting in 1992.

References
Profile on Polish Olympic Committee
 sports-reference

1974 births
Living people
Sportspeople from Kraków
Polish male butterfly swimmers
Olympic swimmers of Poland
Swimmers at the 1992 Summer Olympics
Swimmers at the 1996 Summer Olympics
European Aquatics Championships medalists in swimming
20th-century Polish people